Oryza barthii, also called Barth's rice, wild rice, or African wild rice, is a grass in the rice genus Oryza. It is an annual, erect to semierect grass. It has leaves with a short ligule (<), and panicles that are compact to open, rarely having secondary branching.

This wild rice grows in sub-Saharan Africa, and is found in mopane or savanna woodland, savanna or fadama. O. barthii grows in deep water, seasonally flooded land, stagnant water, and slowly flowing water or pools; it prefers clay or black cotton soils (vertisol), and is found in open habitats. It is the progenitor of cultivated Oryza glaberrima, African rice.

It has nodal roots hosting nitrogen fixing, photosynthetic strains of Bradyrhizobium.

The sequenced genome of O. barthii was published in 2014. This species is one of the AA species, the domesticated rices and their wild relatives.

Distribution
O. barthii is primarily found in West Africa.

References

External links

barthii
Grasses of Africa
Cereals
Taxa named by Auguste Chevalier